St Columba's Presbyterian Church is a Presbyterian church at the corner of Venn and Keane streets in , a suburb of Perth, Western Australia.

History

The suburb of Peppermint Grove was originally predominantly Scottish, and thus Presbyterian. An earlier building, called the St Columba's Presbyterian Church Hall, was built on Venn Street in 1896. It was the first church building in Peppermint Grove and also acted as the only school in the neighbourhood until the construction of the Cottesloe State School.

A few years later, land on the corner of Venn and Keane Streets was donated by Alexander Forrest (1849–1901) to build the current church building. It was designed by architect Louis Bowser Cumpston (1865-1931).

Construction began on 20 November 1909, when the first stone was laid by F. A. Moseley. A foundation stone on the front wall of the church building reads, "This foundation stone of St Columba's church was laid by F.A. Moseley E.s.q. J.P. on the 20th November 1909 'To the Glory of God.'"

Worship services
Worship services take place every Sunday at 10am. The current Minister is the Rev. Dr. Kwangho Song.

References

External links
 

Churches in Perth, Western Australia
Presbyterian churches in Australia
Peppermint Grove, Western Australia
Churches completed in 1909
1909 establishments in Australia
State Register of Heritage Places in the Shire of Peppermint Grove